Driss Lahrichi (born 2 December 1997) is a Moroccan swimmer. He competed in the men's 100 metre backstroke event at the 2016 Summer Olympics. In 2019, he represented Morocco at the 2019 African Games held in Rabat, Morocco.

References

External links
 
 
 
 
 

1997 births
Living people
Moroccan male swimmers
Olympic swimmers of Morocco
Swimmers at the 2016 Summer Olympics
Swimmers at the 2018 Mediterranean Games
Place of birth missing (living people)
Swimmers at the 2019 African Games
African Games bronze medalists for Morocco
African Games medalists in swimming
Male backstroke swimmers
Mediterranean Games competitors for Morocco
20th-century Moroccan people
21st-century Moroccan people